Abraham Cohen (March 23, 1933 – March 8, 2001) was an American football guard who played one season with the Boston Patriots of the American Football League (AFL). He was drafted by the New York Giants in the 26th round of the 1955 NFL Draft. He played college football at the University of Tennessee at Chattanooga. Cohen was also a member of the Hamilton Tiger-Cats of the Canadian Football League (CFL).

College career
Cohen played for the Chattanooga Moccasins from 1954 to 1955. He also wrestled for the Moccasins. He won the Southern Intercollegiate Wrestling Association (SIWA) championship in the 190 pound weight class in 1954. Cohen then won the SIWA heavyweight championship in 1955 and 1956. He was inducted into the UTC Athletics Hall of Fame in 1990.

Professional career
Cohen was selected by the New York Giants of the National Football League (NFL) with the 308th pick in the 1955 NFL Draft. He later played for Fort Hood in the Shrimp Bowl in 1957. He was a member of the Hamilton Tiger-Cats of the CFL from 1958 to 1959. Cohen signed with the Boston Patriots of the AFL in June 1960 and played in fourteen games for the team during the 1960 season.

References

External links
Just Sports Stats

1933 births
2001 deaths
Players of American football from Pennsylvania
American football guards
Chattanooga Mocs football players
American male sport wrestlers
Boston Patriots players
Jewish American sportspeople
People from Plymouth, Pennsylvania
American Football League players
20th-century American Jews